Pedro Balcells (born 8 July 1954 in Olot) is a Spanish former breaststroke swimmer who competed in the 1972 Summer Olympics and in the 1976 Summer Olympics.

References

1954 births
Living people
Spanish male breaststroke swimmers
Olympic swimmers of Spain
Swimmers at the 1972 Summer Olympics
Swimmers at the 1976 Summer Olympics
Swimmers from Catalonia
Mediterranean Games gold medalists for Spain
Swimmers at the 1971 Mediterranean Games
Swimmers at the 1975 Mediterranean Games
Mediterranean Games medalists in swimming
People from Garrotxa
Sportspeople from the Province of Girona